The Smiling Angel (French: L'Ange au Sourire), also known as the Smile of Reims (Le Sourire de Reims), is a stone sculpture at the cathedral of Reims. The Angel was carved between 1236 and 1245. This figure is in the north portal of the west facade of the cathedral.

The Angel statue was beheaded following a fire caused by a German shell on the cathedral of Reims, during World War I, on 19 September 1914, and the head broke into several pieces after falling from a height of four meters.

The head was collected by the abbot Thinot the day after the fire, and stored in the cellars of the Archbishop of Reims to be discovered by the architect Max Sainsaulieu on the 30 November 1915. It became an icon for the French wartime propaganda as a symbol of "French culture destroyed by German barbarity".

After the war, the original fragments were molded and preserved in the Musée national des Monuments Français. The already famous sculpture was restored and put back in place 13 February 1926.

References

Statues in France
Sculptures of angels
World War I propaganda